The 2021 Meath Senior Football Championship was the 129th edition of the Meath GAA's premier club Gaelic football tournament for senior clubs in County Meath, Ireland with 16 teams competing. The winner will represent Meath in the Leinster Senior Club Football Championship. The championship starts with a group stage and then progresses to a knock out stage.

Ratoath were the defending champions after they defeated Gaeil Colmcille in the 2020 final to claim their second S.F.C. crown and their second S.F.C. championship in a row.

In 2020, Ballinabrackey won the I.F.C. for the first time in their history to reach the top flight.

The draw for the group stages of the championship were made on 20 June 2021 with the games commencing on 13 August 2021.

On 7 November 2021, Wolfe Tones won the Keegan Cup by beating St. Peter's Dunboyne 1-9 to 0-9 in the final. This was Wolfe Tones' second Keegan Cup success in their history and their first since 2006. Wolfe Tones captain and defender, Shane Glynn, was awarded the Man of the Match.

Dunshaughlin were relegated to the Meath Intermediate Football Championship after losing to Navan O'Mahony's in the relegation playoff final. They will compete at Intermediate level for the first time since winning the 1997 Meath Intermediate Football Championship.

Championship Structure
The 2021 Meath S.F.C. consists of 16 teams drawn into four groups each containing four teams. The top two teams progress to the quarter-finals, while the bottom two in each group contest the Relegation Quarter-Finals. The losers of each Relegation Quarter-Final then contest the Relegation Semi-Finals, the losers of which will play-off for the right to retain their senior status into 2022.

Team Changes
The following teams have changed division since the 2020 championship season.

To S.F.C.
Promoted from 2020 I.F.C.
 Ballinabrackey - (Intermediate Champions)

From S.F.C.
Relegated to 2021 I.F.C.
 Nobber

Participating teams
The teams taking part in the 2021 Meath Senior Football Championship are:

Group stage 

There are four groups of four teams called Group A, B, C and D. The 1st and 2nd placed teams in each group qualify for the quarter-finals.
The 3rd and 4th placed team in each group will proceed to the Relegation Play-Off to determine which team will suffer relegation.

The draw for the group stages of the championship were made on 20 June 2021.

Tiebreakers:
If two or more teams were equal on points on completion of the group matches, the following tie-breaking criteria would be applied:

All Football Championships and Leagues shall be run on a combination of a league and knockout basis under Rule 6.21 T.O. Where teams finish equal with points for qualification or relegation process for concluding stages, the positioning shall be decided as follows;

 (i) Where three teams are involved - the outcome of the meetings of the three teams in their previous games in the competition. If three teams finish level on points for three places and one team has beaten the other two teams that team qualifies in first place and other places are determined by the specified order. If there are two positions and one team has beaten the other two teams that team qualifies and the second place is determined by the specified order. If there is one position and one team has beaten the other two team that team qualifies;
 (ii) Where two teams are involved - the outcome of the meeting of the two teams in the previous game in the competition;
 (iii) Scoring Difference;
 (iv) Highest total scores for;
 (v) A play-off.

Group A

Round 1
 Ratoath 1-18, 1-8 Dunshaughlin, Ashbourne, 15/8/2021
 Donaghmore/Ashbourne 0-13, 1-11 Navan O'Mahonys, Dunshaughlin, 15/8/2021

Round 2
 Donaghmore/Ashbourne 0-14, 2-12 Ratoath, Páirc Tailteann, 29/8/2021
 Dunshaughlin 4-11, 2-8 Navan O'Mahony's, Dunsany, 29/8/2021

Round 3
 Dunshaughlin 1-8, 2-16 Donaghmore/Ashbourne, Skryne, 10/9/2021
 Navan O'Mahony's 0-10, 1-15 Ratoath, Donore, 10/9/2021

Group B

Round 1
 St. Colmcille's 4-17, 2-10 Ballinabrackey, Pairc Tailteann, 14/8/2021
 Na Fianna 3-18, 1-12 Curraha, Trim, 15/8/2021

Round 2
 Na Fianna 2-11, 0-11 St. Colmcille's, Páirc Tailteann, 28/8/2021
 Ballinabrackey 1-13, 2-4 Curraha, Summerhill, 29/8/2021

Round 3
 Na Fianna 3-11, 3-11 Ballinabrackey, Clonard, 12/9/2021
 St. Colmcille's 4-21, 2-8 Curraha, Ardcath, 12/9/2021

Group C

Round 1
 Simonstown Gaels 1-15, 1-16 Moynalvey, Skryne, 15/8/2021
 Gaeil Colmcille 1-7, 1-7 Wolfe Tones, Pairc Tailteann, 15/8/2021

Round 2
 Moynalvey 2-7, 3-15 Gaeil Colmcille, Trim, 29/8/2021
 Wolfe Tones 2-14, 0-10 Simonstown Gaels, Páirc Tailteann, 29/8/2021

Round 3
 Wolfe Tones 3-13, 2-11 Moynalvey, Skryne, 12/9/2021
 Simonstown Gaels 2-11, 1-19 Gaeil Colmcille, Páirc Tailteann, 12/9/2021

Group D

Round 1
 St. Peter's Dunboyne 0-10, 0-10 Skryne, Pairc Tailteann, 13/8/2021
 Summerhill 1-15, 2-9 Seneschalstown, Pairc Tailteann, 15/8/2021

Round 2
 St. Peter's Dunboyne 4-20, 2-6 Seneschalstown, Skryne, 27/8/2021
 Summerhill 1-18, 1-12 Skryne, Moynalvey, 28/8/2021

Round 3
 Summerhill 1-6, 1-13 St. Peter's Dunboyne, Páirc Tailteann, 12/9/2021
 Skryne 4-9, 1-7 Seneschalstown, Stamullen, 12/9/2021

Knock-Out Stage

The 1st and 2nd placed teams in each group qualify for the quarter-finals.

Quarter-finals

Semi-finals

Final

Relegation play-off
The Relegation Play-Off consisted of the 3rd and 4th-placed finishers in each group. The winners of each playoff retained their senior status while the outright loser was relegated to the Intermediate championship for 2022. Navan O'Mahony's defeated Dunshaughlin in the relegation final to retain their senior status while Dunshaughlin were relegated to the 2022 Meath Intermediate Football Championship.

Relegation Quarter-Finals

Relegation Semi-Finals

Relegation Final

References

External links

Meath SFC
Meath Senior Football Championship
Meath Senior Football Championship